The rufous-headed pygmy tyrant (Pseudotriccus ruficeps) is a species of bird in the family Tyrannidae. It is found in Bolivia, Colombia, Ecuador, and Peru. Its natural habitat is subtropical or tropical moist montane forests.

References

rufous-headed pygmy tyrant
Birds of the Northern Andes
rufous-headed pygmy tyrant
Taxonomy articles created by Polbot